Herbert Gresford Jones  (1870–1958) was an Anglican bishop, the third Suffragan Bishop of Warrington.

Born on 7 April 1870 and educated at Haileybury and Trinity College, Cambridge, he was ordained in 1894. He began his career with a curacy at St Helen's Parish Church, Sefton, before Incumbencies at St Michael's-in-the-Hamlet, Liverpool, and St John’s. From there he rose rapidly being successively Rural Dean  of Bradford and then Archdeacon of Sheffield.  In 1920, he was appointed as the first suffragan bishop of Kampala, but he returned to England in 1923 as Vicar of Pershore.  From 1927 until 1945, he served as Bishop of Warrington.  A firm friend to churches overseas, he retired 18 years later and died on 22 June 1958. His son, Michael Gresford Jones, was also a Bishop.

Works
Foreign Missions and the Modern Mind, 1905
Uganda in Transformation, 1926

Notes

1870 births
1958 deaths
People educated at Haileybury and Imperial Service College
Alumni of Trinity College, Cambridge
Archdeacons of Sheffield
Bishops of Warrington
20th-century Church of England bishops